Alexander Gordon-Lennox is the name of:

Sir Alexander Gordon-Lennox (Royal Navy officer) (1911–1987), admiral of the Royal Navy
Lord Alexander Gordon-Lennox (1825–1892), British Conservative politician